McMann is a surname. Notable people with the surname include:

Charlene McMann, American advocate
Chuck McMann (1951–2021), Canadian football player

Jamie McMann (born 1976), American record producer
Lisa McMann (born 1968), American writer
Paul McMann, American businessman
Sara McMann (born 1980), American wrestler
Scott McMann (born 1996), Scottish footballer

See also
McMahon
McMahan
McMahen